Yenumulapalle is a census town in Anantapur district of the Indian state of Andhra Pradesh. It is located in Yenumulapalle mandal.

External links 

Cities and towns in Anantapur district